Front Row Joe is an animated anthropomorphic cat developed as the mascot for the American movie theater chain Cinemark Theatres in 1988. The mascot was created by the now-defunct animation studio Wilming Reams Animation in San Antonio, Texas. He appeared in policy trailers and advertisements until he was retired in 1998 when Cinemark rebranded to an Art Deco design. The mascot returned in 2004 for Cinemark's 20th anniversary, and again in 2018. He no longer appears in policy trailers, but still does appear in promotional advertisements and special events.

Personality

Front Row Joe appears as a popular, friendly, dancing and cool cat who is a theater-goer and appreciated by everyone except the antagonist Clyde. Joe obeys all of the rules and regulations listed.

Other characters
Starstruck Penny (originally Popcorn Penny) Penny is a light orange cat with a purple hair bow, green shirt, and purple skirt. She is Joe's girlfriend and started appearing in 1991.
Clyde is a dark grey cat with a blue jacket and red nose. He is the antagonist of Front Row Joe and does such boorish behavior and violations that is against the policy such as littering and smoking in the movie theater.
Elton is a short chubby brown cat with a red nose who is the assistant of Clyde and is not usually anthropomorphic. Elton occasionally joins Joe and later become best friends.
The male ushers are blue cats who took the main singing role until 1991 with Joe. There was a pink-colored female version based on the Andrew Sisters and appeared in one trailer in 1991.

Appearance
Joe has orange fur and originally wears a purple jacket with a necklace featuring the Cinemark logo until 1990 when he started buttoning his jacket. The logo then appeared on the right side of his jacket, closer to the collar of his shirt. He was a silent character until when he started taking the singing role in 1991. Joe has also worn a scarf in a holiday policy trailer and occasionally wears sunglasses.

On a policy trailer made by Cinema Concepts for Cinemark's 20th anniversary in 2004, Joe made a comeback in CGI wearing a tuxedo with a red tie.

In 2018, a new CGI design was created by ATK PLN for Joe, with beige color added on much of his fur including his hands, feet, upper tail, eyebrows, mouth, and ears. He wears a red and white-striped shirt and black necktie covered with a red sleeveless shirt and black jeans. His accessories include a license, name pin, and digital watch. He occasionally wears other outfits such as a jungle explorer and summer outfit.

Merchandise
During Joe's original run, cinemas offered merchandising such as plastic kid-sized cups, plush, and t-shirts.

References 

Animated characters
Fictional cats
Feline mascots
Fictional anthropomorphic characters
Mascots introduced in 1988
Male characters in advertising